Aziza Hussein is a Paralympian athlete from Egypt competing mainly in category F56-58 javelin throw events.

She competed in the 2004 Summer Paralympics in Athens, Greece. There she won a bronze medal in the women's F56-58 javelin throw event.

External links
 

Paralympic athletes of Egypt
Athletes (track and field) at the 2004 Summer Paralympics
Paralympic bronze medalists for Egypt
Living people
Medalists at the 2004 Summer Paralympics
Year of birth missing (living people)
Paralympic medalists in athletics (track and field)
Egyptian javelin throwers